Plainfield Township is located in Will County, Illinois. As of the 2010 census, its population was 80,318 and it contained 25,333 housing units.  Plainfield Township government serves the residents in the Illinois communities of Plainfield, Joliet, Romeoville and Crest Hill. Plainfield Township's boundaries run to the North by 135th Street, to the South by Theodore Street, to the East by Gaylord Road and to the West by County Line Road. See also Plainfield Public Library District

Geography

Cities, Towns, Villages
 Joliet (small portion)
 Plainfield (vast majority)
 Romeoville (small portion)

Other Communities
 Crystal Lawns (vast majority)

Demographics

References

External links
 US Census
 Will County Official Site
 Illinois State Archives

Townships in Will County, Illinois
Townships in Illinois
1849 establishments in Illinois